Lakewood / Fort McPherson is an embankment rail station in Atlanta and East Point, Georgia, serving the Red and Gold lines of the Metropolitan Atlanta Rapid Transit Authority (MARTA) rail system. It has an island platform between two tracks. It opened on December 15, 1984. The set up for this station is like many on the East-West line. In a similar layout to that of Oakland City, the road adjacent to the station must be traversed for station access; in the case of Lakewood/Fort MacPherson, a bridge over the roadway is utilized rather than an underpass.

As the name suggests, it provides access to the historic and now-defunct Fort McPherson, and Lakewood. Bus service is provided to the Barge Road Park & Ride, Greenbriar Mall, Southside Industrial Park, and Cellairis Amphitheatre.

Station layout

Bus routes
The station is served by the following MARTA bus routes:
 Route 42 - Pryor Street / McDaniel Street
 Route 178 - Empire Boulevard / Southside Industrial Park
 Route 183 - Barge Road Park & Ride / Lakewood
 Route 191 - Riverdale / ATL International Terminal.
 Route 194 - Conley Road / Mt. Zion.
 Route 295 - Metropolitan Campus Express

See also
Metropolitan Atlanta Rapid Transit Authority

References

External links
MARTA Station Page
nycsubway.org Atlanta page
 Lee Street entrance from Google Maps Street View
 Murphy Avenue entrance from Google Maps Street View

Gold Line (MARTA)
Red Line (MARTA)
Metropolitan Atlanta Rapid Transit Authority stations
Railway stations in the United States opened in 1984
Railway stations in Atlanta
1984 establishments in Georgia (U.S. state)